R Vanaroja (b 1963) is an Indian politician and Member of Parliament elected from Tamil Nadu. She is elected to the Lok Sabha from Tiruvannamalai constituency as an Anna Dravida Munnetra Kazhagam candidate in 2014 election.

She is a post graduate and Tiruvannamalai district (south) AIADMK Women's Wing secretary and native of Neepathurai village in Chengam taluk.

Education Qualifications 
M.A., B.Ed. Educated at Annamalai University

Positions Held 
May, 2014 Elected to 16th Lok Sabha
1 Sep. 2014 onwards Member, Committee on Empowerment of Women Member, Standing Committee on Information Technology Member, Consultative Committee, Ministry of Women and Child Development.

References 

All India Anna Dravida Munnetra Kazhagam politicians
Living people
India MPs 2014–2019
Lok Sabha members from Tamil Nadu
1963 births
People from Tiruvannamalai district
Women in Tamil Nadu politics
20th-century Indian women politicians
20th-century Indian politicians
21st-century Indian women politicians
21st-century Indian politicians
Women members of the Lok Sabha
Annamalai University alumni